The 1999 Züri-Metzgete was the 84th edition of the Züri-Metzgete road cycling one day race. It was held on 22 August 1999 as part of the 1999 UCI Road World Cup. The race was won by Grzegorz Gwiazdowski of Poland.

Result

References 

Züri-Metzgete
Züri-Metzgete
Züri-Metzgete